The Nokia C7-00 is a smartphone from the Nokia Cseries. It was introduced on 14 September 2010 and released in Q4 2010. Nokia's mobile phone business head Anssi Vanjoki called it the "sleekest" device in the world. Unlike the Nokia N8 flagship, the C7 has physical call and hangup buttons.

The C7 is updatable to Symbian Belle (update made available on 7 February 2012)

The Nokia C7 Astound was also released for the T-Mobile USA, but has only one casing colour available, and omits 1900 MHz HSDPA (3G) band.

On 25 May 2011 the premium Nokia Oro was announced, which has the same internal specifications and even looks exactly like the C7, but has 18-carat gold plating, leather and sapphire crystal materials. It shipped with the "Anna" Symbian update.

Dimensions
Size: 118.3 × 56.8 × 10.5 mm
Weight (with battery):

Keys and input methods
Touch screen
On-screen alphanumeric keypad and full keyboard

Personalisation
 Six customisable home screens (in Nokia Belle)
 Widgets
 Themes
 Customisable profiles

NFC
The C7 shipped with an NFC chip built-in, but the chip was not enabled until the following year, with the release of Symbian Anna, a new version of the OS. The feature could be used to pair with headsets, read NFC tags, or, through AirTag e-commerce software, be used to accumulate loyalty points or pick up discount coupons.

Software and applications

Software platform and user interface
The C7-00 runs the Symbian operating system, originally shipping with Symbian^3 and updatable to Anna and later Belle. Nokia Belle supports six home screens, each with re-sized widgets that the user can customise. Nokia released the Nokia Belle update via Nokia Suite (v3.3.86 or higher), with Anna previously released through FOTA or Nokia Suite (for PC or Mac) or Nokia Software updater on 18 August 2011. Nokia (Symbian) Belle v.111.030.0609 has been made available on 7 February 2012, along with other devices in the original Symbian^3 line-up. Several countries do not have the Belle update available for the Nokia C7. There is no current release date scheduled and it is not clear if the update will be released for the countries that do not currently have it available. If a phone has an IMEI indicating it is from one of these markets, it can not be updated to a Belle release.

Personal information management
Detailed contact information
Calendar
To-do list
Notes
Recorder
Clock

Navigation
Integrated GPS, with A-GPS functionality
Nokia Maps with free car and pedestrian navigation

Photography

Camera
8 megapixel (3264 x 2448 pixels) camera
Aperture: f/2.8
Focal length: 4.3 mm
Fixed-focus lens with Extended Depth of Field (EDoF), marketed as "full focus"
Still images file format: JPEG/Exif
Secondary camera for video calls (VGA, 640×480 pixels)
Face recognition software (in Nokia Store for older phones)

Image capture
Automatic location tagging of images and videos
Photo editor

Other
Built-in memory: 8 GB
MicroSD memory card slot, up to 32 GB
NFC enabled

Video

Video cameras
Main camera
Video capture in 720p 30 fps (after update to Nokia Belle) with codecs H.264, MPEG-4
Dual microphones for stereo audio recording
Secondary VGA camera for video calls

Video sharing and playback
HD 720p, 30 fps video playback
Web TV
Video call and video sharing
DivX and Xvid support

Music and audio

Music features
Music codecs: MP3, WMA, AAC, eAAC, eAAC+, AMR-NB, AMR-WB
Short range FM transmitter

References

External links

Nokia C7-00 Device Details at Nokia Developer
Nokia C7-00 press release
Nokia Support Discussions

Mobile phones introduced in 2010
Nokia smartphones
Mobile phones with user-replaceable battery